The 2005 World Women's Curling Championship was held from March 19–27, 2005 at the Lagoon Leisure Centre in Paisley, Scotland. The tournament was the first since the 1988 event to be held separately from the 2005 Ford World Men's Curling Championship.

The tournament was plagued with problems from the start. Ice conditions were not the best, due to a number of factors, including the arena being located adjacent to a swimming pool. Also, de-ionized water, a standard at major events was not used for the first draws, due to a refusal by the organising committee to pay for it. These ice issues led to the postponement of the fourth draw. Also, ticket prices were very expensive, leading to poor attendance numbers. Due to a dispute with volunteers who wanted to be paid, time clocks were not used. This meant that the on-ice umpire was allowed to pull rocks out of a game as a penalty for slow play. This arguably cost the Russian team a loss in one game.

In the end, it was Sweden, skipped by Anette Norberg who won her first championship, and Sweden's first since 1999, with a win in the final over the United States, skipped by Cassandra Johnson. Norway, skipped by Dordi Nordby won bronze.

Qualifying
Teams qualified for the World Curling Championship in a series of different tournaments depending on their location.

European teams qualified through the Le Gruyère 2004 European Curling Championships, held in Sofia, Bulgaria, December 4–11, 2004. Eight of the twelve qualifying teams (Sweden, Switzerland, Norway, Russia, Scotland, Italy, Finland, and Denmark) were selected from Europe.

Australian and Asian teams qualified through the 2004 Pacific Curling Championships in Chuncheon, South Korea. Two teams (Japan and China) qualified for the World Curling Championship.

The Canadian women's team was selected through the 2005 Scott Tournament of Hearts. The U.S. team was selected through the 2006 U.S. Olympic Team Trials.

Teams
The 2005 World Women's Curling Championship was contested between teams from three continents: Asia, Europe, and North America. The list of teams differed from the Men's Curling Championship. Teams included 1990 and 1991 World Champion Dordi Nordby of Norway and 2001 Silver medalist Anette Norberg of Sweden. Joining them in their 4th trip to the worlds was Olga Jarkova's Russian team, in their 3rd appearance were Yumie Hayashi of Japan and Diana Gaspari of Italy, making their 2nd appearance were Mirjam Ott of Switzerland, Madeleine Dupont of Denmark, Kirsi Nykanen of Finland and Kelly Wood of Scotland. Making their first appearance at the worlds were Jennifer Jones of Canada, Wang Bingyu of China and Cassandra Johnson of the United States.

Round-robin standings

*First Appearance

Round-robin results

Draw 1
March 19, 2005 10:00

Draw 2
March 19, 2005 15:00

Draw 3
March 19, 2005 20:00

Draw 5
March 20, 2005 14:00

Draw 6
March 20, 2005 19:00

Draw 7
March 21, 2005 09:30

Draw 8
March 21, 2005 14:00

Draw 9
March 21, 2005 19:00

Draw 10
March 22, 2005 09:30

Draw 11
March 22, 2005 14:00

Draw 12
March 22, 2005 19:00

Draw 13
March 23, 2005 09:30

Draw 14
March 23, 2005 14:00

Draw 15
March 23, 2005 19:00

Draw 16
March 24, 2005 09:30

Draw 17
March 24, 2005 14:00

Draw 4
March 25, 2005 09:30
Originally scheduled for March 20, 2005

Tie-breaker
March 25, 2005 14:00

Page playoffs
For the first time ever, the World championships used the page playoff system where the top four teams with the best records at the end of round-robin play meet in the playoff rounds. The first and second place teams play each other, with the winner advancing directly to the final. The winner of the other page playoff game between the third and fourth place teams plays the loser of the first/second playoff game in the semi-final. The winner of the semi-final moves on to the final.

Brackets

1 vs. 2 game
March 26, 2005 09:30

3 vs. 4 game
March 26, 2005 14:00

Semifinal
March 26, 2005 19:00

Final
March 27, 2005 15:00

Round-robin player percentages

References
 

2005 Women
World Women's Curling Championship
Sport in Paisley, Renfrewshire
Women's curling competitions in Scotland
Curl
International curling competitions hosted by Scotland
March 2005 sports events in the United Kingdom